Jequié is a city in the state of Bahia, Brazil. Jequié is 365 km away from Salvador, in the Southwest region of Bahia. It is nicknamed "Cidade Sol", meaning "The Sun City" because of its high temperatures. Surrounded by mountains, the city suffers with the heat during the whole year. On summer days, the temperature can reach 48 °C.
Jequié is rich on Iron Ore, so it is very hot during the day, and cold at night.
It is also known as "Chicago Baiana".

Gallery

References

Municipalities in Bahia